Tarpenbek is a stream running from Norderstedt (Schleswig-Holstein) through parts of Hamburg before joining the Alster in Eppendorf.

See also
List of rivers of Schleswig-Holstein
List of rivers of Hamburg

Rivers of Schleswig-Holstein
Rivers of Hamburg
Rivers of Germany